Gordioidea is an order (sometimes placed at superfamily level) of parasitic horsehair worms.  Its taxonomy remains uncertain, but appears to be contained in the monotypic class Gordioida and contains about 320 known species.

Biology
Gordioidean adults are free-living in freshwater or semi-terrestrial habitats and larvae parasitise insects, primarily Orthopterans.  Unlike Nectonematoideans, which are marine, gordioideans lack lateral rows of setae and have a single, ventral epidermal cord and their blastocoel is filled with mesenchyme in young worms but become open when older.

Families and genera
The Integrated Taxonomic Information System lists the following genera in two families:

Chordodidae
Auth. May, 1919; selected genera:
Subfamily Chordodinae Heinze, 1935

 Chordodes Creplin, 1847
 Dacochordodes Capuse, 1965
 Euchordodes Heinze, 1937
 Neochordodes Carvalho, 1942
 Pantachordodes Heinze, 1954
 Spinochordodes Kirjanova, 1950
Subfamily Paragordiinae

 Paragordius Camerano, 1897
incertae sedis
 Gordionus Müller, 1927
 Parachordodes Camerano, 1897
 Paragordionus Heinze, 1935
 Semigordionus Heinze, 1952

Gordiidae
Auth. May, 1919 	 
 Acutogordius Heinze, 1952 	 
 Gordius Linnaeus, 1758

References

External links
 

Nematomorpha
Animal orders
Nematoida
Parasitic protostomes